Hapoel Neve Golan  is an Israeli football club based in Neve Golan, Jaffa, Tel Aviv. The club is currently in Liga Gimel Tel Aviv division.

History
The club was founded in 1969 and started at the newly formed bottom tier, Liga Dalet. Neve Golan reached Liga Bet, the fourth tier of Israeli football in the 1981–82 season. In the following season, the club reached its best placing ever, which was fourth in Liga Bet South A division. Neve Golan dropped back to Liga Gimel after they finished bottom of South A division in the 1984–85 season.

The club is currently playing in Liga Gimel Tel Aviv division. In 2011, former Israel international, Felix Halfon, played for the club. Halfon returned to the club in 2014, before leaving for Elitzur Jaffa Tel Aviv during the season.

At the end of the 2014–15 season, the club finished on top of Liga Gimel Tel Aviv division, level on points with Ironi Beit Dagan, which they faced in a decisive promotion play-off. Neve Golan lost 2–3 and remained in Liga Gimel.

Honours

League

External links
Hapoel Neve Golan  Israel Football Association

References

Neve Golan
Neve Golan
Football clubs in Tel Aviv
Association football clubs established in 1969
1969 establishments in Israel
Arab-Israeli football clubs